The House of Intrigue is an Italian wartime espionage film released in 1956 under the Italian title of Londra Chiama Polo Nord (London calling North Pole). It was written and directed by Duilio Coletti. The film score was composed by Nino Rota.

Synopsis

The film stars Philippe Hersent as Landers (code name North Pole), a British radio operator and cryptographer captured in occupied Holland. Under the watchful eye of Colonel Bernes (Curd Jurgens) and other Nazi officials he is forced to send false and misleading radio messages to London in an attempt to undermine British intelligence. This results in the capture of numerous British operatives and resistance fighters.

Meanwhile, in Britain Lt Mary Wintergreen, a pretty female officer (Dawn Addams), says goodbye to her agent boyfriend Cpt John Guinness (Dario Michaelis). Through the radio deception, John and other agents are captured. When John escapes he sends messages to Britain to contradict North Pole's messages but the German's send a balancing message saying that John Guinness himself is the double agent sending misleading information. When Guinness reaches Britain he is put on trial for treason and is sentenced to hang, partly on Mary's own evidence.
In Holland the Dutch resistance leader, The Gorilla (Folco Lulli), leads an attempt to release the British agents from the abbey where they are imprisoned. This is unsuccessful and most of the resistance fighters are killed. The Gorilla meets secretly with Col Bernes and tries to trade a list of British agents for his own brother's release (Chris).

Mary sneaks into Holland and makes her way to a music shop in Amsterdam to try to track down Landers (and clear Guinness). She narrowly evades capture as the store owner is a double agent.

Chris is released, but his co-prisoners are allowed to watch his departure and suspect treachery. Mary, however is captured, and falls into the hands of Col Bernes. He shows pity on her as they had a previous affair in Barcelona and gives her free passage to the border. Owing to this unwarranted release Bernes is taken away for his own execution.

Production 
Filming on London CALLS North Pole began with studio recordings in Rome in October/November 1955, shooting continued in January 1956 with location recordings in Amsterdam and the surrounding area. The premiere took place in Italy on November 30, 1956, the German premiere was on July 27, 1957 in Stuttgart's Gloria-Palast.

Reviews 
Der Spiegel wrote: “The busy Curd Jürgens in his best role for a long time as a humane and efficient head of “defense” in occupied Holland: The plot … goes back to a factual report, and the military events on the underground front may well correspond to reality. Less likely appears a love story that is faded in, involving the German counter-intelligence chief and a British agent (Dawn Addams).”

Cast

Mark Landers - Philippe Hersent
Col Bernes - Curd Jurgens
Mary - Dawn Addams
King Kong Kandren, the Gorilla - Folco Lulli
Chris, leader of the captured agents - Matteo Spinola
Henry - Giacomo Rossi Stuart
Hermann - Rene Deltgen
Herbert - Ludovico Ceriana
Felix - Christopher Hofer
Mac - Alphonse Mathis
John Guiness - Dario Michaelis
Official - Edoardo Toniolo
Matt - Albert Lieven

References

1956 films
1956 war films
Italian war drama films
Films set in Amsterdam
Films directed by Duilio Coletti
Films scored by Nino Rota
Films about Dutch resistance
World War II spy films
Italian spy drama films
Italian World War II films
1950s Italian films